In the Bedroom is a 2001 American independent drama film directed by Todd Field from a screenplay written by Field and Robert Festinger, based on the 1979 short story "Killings" by Andre Dubus. It stars Sissy Spacek, Tom Wilkinson, Nick Stahl, Marisa Tomei, and William Mapother. The film centers on the inner dynamics of a family in transition. Matt Fowler (Wilkinson) is a doctor practicing in Maine and is married to Ruth Fowler (Spacek), a music teacher. Their son Frank (Stahl) is involved in a love affair with an older single mother, Natalie Strout (Tomei). As the beauty of Maine's brief and fleeting summer comes to an end, these characters find themselves in the midst of an unimaginable tragedy.

The title refers to the rear compartment of a lobster trap known as the "bedroom" and how it can hold only two lobsters before the lobsters begin to turn on each other. In the Bedroom premiered at the Sundance Film Festival. It was theatrically released in limited theatres on November 23, 2001 and grossed $44.8 million against a $1.7 million budget.

The film was praised for Field's direction, its screenplay and the performances (particularly those of Spacek, Wilkinson, Stahl and Tomei). In the Bedroom was chosen by the American Film Institute as one of the top ten films of the year while Spacek's performance was named the best female performance of the year. The film received five Oscar nominations at the 74th Academy Awards: Best Picture, Best Actress (for Spacek), Best Actor (for Wilkinson), Best Supporting Actress (for Tomei), and Best Adapted Screenplay, and also three nominations at the 59th Golden Globe Awards including for the Best Motion Picture – Drama, and winning Best Actress – Drama (for Spacek).

Plot
In the Mid-Coast town of Camden, Maine, Matt and Ruth Fowler enjoy a happy marriage and a good relationship with their son Frank, a recent college graduate who has come home for the summer. Frank has fallen in love with a divorced older woman with children, Natalie Strout; Ruth is openly concerned about Frank's relationship with Natalie, while Matt thinks it is only a fling.

Frank is about to begin graduate school for architecture, but is having second thoughts and considering staying in town to continue working as a fisherman and, more importantly, to be near Natalie and her kids. Natalie's ex-husband, Richard Strout, tries to find a way into his ex-wife and children's lives, going to increasingly violent lengths to get his intentions across to Natalie, including assaulting Frank. Frank resists Ruth's insistence he report Richard's violence to the police, but neither she nor Matt call them.

Frank rushes to Natalie's home one evening after receiving a frightened phone call from one of her children. He arrives to find the living room trashed, and Natalie in distress. She tells him Richard just left, and pleads with him not to call the police, but Richard, still enraged, returns almost immediately. Natalie takes the boys upstairs, and Frank insists through the locked front door that Richard leave. He feigns doing so, only to break in through the back door with a handgun; in the ensuing scuffle, Frank is shot in the face and killed.

Though equally devastated, Matt and Ruth grieve in different ways, with Matt putting on a brave face while Ruth becomes reclusive and quiet. Richard is set free on bail, paid by his well-to-do family, and both Matt and Ruth are forced to see him around town.

The couple retreat with friends Willis and Katie Grinnel to a secluded cottage for a weekend, but Ruth is distant; she rarely contributes to conversation, eyes Matt's drinking suspiciously, and sleeps most of the ride home. The next Saturday, Matt tells Ruth he's going into the office, but he instead goes to the convenience store where Natalie works. The two speak briefly, but Matt begins to become emotional, so he leaves. He goes fishing, and badly cuts his right index finger hauling lobster traps.

The tension between Matt and Ruth increases when their lawyer informs them that the lack of an eyewitness to Frank's shooting means Richard will instead be charged with accidental manslaughter, and will likely only serve five to ten years in prison. Ruth is openly distraught by this, Matt seems deflated. He and Willis spend the evening drinking and lamenting the injustice of the situation.

Natalie approaches Ruth at work and attempts to apologize, but Ruth slaps her before dismissively returning to her papers. Natalie leaves in tears. Later that same day, Ruth accidentally runs into Richard again while buying cigarettes.

When she returns home, an argument erupts between the couple in which each one confronts and emotionally savages the other; Matt lambastes Ruth for being an overbearing presence in Frank's youth, while Ruth in turn chastises Matt for showing little grief for their deceased son. A little girl knocks on the door, interrupting them, and Matt buys $10 worth of chocolate from her. He returns, measured now, and apologizes to Ruth, who apologizes in turn and, breaking down, tells Matt about seeing Natalie and Richard. The two embrace. With the air cleared, the couple is finally able to find common ground in their grief.

Matt then abducts Richard at gunpoint, saying he's arranged for Richard to jump bail and leave the state, so as to spare them the pain of seeing him in Camden. He forces Richard to "pack clothes for warm weather" and plants a train schedule in his apartment. He forces Richard to drive them out to the Grinnel cabin, where Willis is waiting with another vehicle. He begins to load Richard's belongings, but Matt hesitates - and then shoots Richard once in the shoulder and twice in the back, killing him. Willis is shocked, admonishing Matt for not following the plan. Matt responds simply that he couldn't wait. The two successfully bury Richard's body deep in the woods beyond the cabin, but are stuck unexpectedly at a bridge crossing on their return home. Willis laments that this cost them nearly an hour - meaning they arrive back in town just after sunrise at 4:00am instead of in darkness at 3:00am - and Matt apologizes.

Matt returns home and wraps his clothes in an old blanket, before washing himself in the downstairs sink. He returns to the bedroom upstairs to find Ruth awake and smoking in bed. She asks him, "Did you do it?" Matt appears troubled and unresponsive. He climbs into bed and then turns away from her. She asks if he's okay, and Matt haltingly describes a photo he saw in Richard's apartment of him with Natalie in a loving pose, but cannot explain why it affected him. Finally, Ruth gets up to make coffee. Matt rolls over onto his back and removes the band-aid from the finger he injured hauling traps - his trigger finger - to examine the healing wound underneath. Ruth calls from the kitchen, "Matt, do you want coffee?" but he doesn't answer.

Cast
 Sissy Spacek as Ruth Fowler
 Tom Wilkinson as Matt Fowler
 Nick Stahl as Frank Fowler
 Marisa Tomei as Natalie Strout
 William Mapother as Richard Strout
 Celia Weston as Katie Grinnel
 Karen Allen as Marla Keyes
 Deborah Derecktor as Janelle
 William Wise as Willis Grinnel
 Justin Ashforth as Tim Bryson
 Camden Munson as Jason Strout
 Frank T. Wells as Henry
 Kevin Chapman as Tim’s Friend
 Veronica Cartwright as Minister on Television

Sundance
In the Bedroom made its debut at the 2001 Sundance Film Festival. In a 2022 profile by The New Yorker, Todd Field recalled that when the film got acquired by Miramax Films, he was devastated, meaning that his film could be heavily re-edited by Harvey Weinstein in order to fit mass appeal. He then called Tom Cruise, a personal friend of his, and asked for advice. Cruise advised him to not give Weinstein any pushback and allow him to make all the edits. He suggested to wait until it tested poorly with audiences and then remind them of how well the film did at the film festival so they would release the original cut. Cruise’s advice worked and Field ended up releasing the original cut theatrically.

Critic Dennis Lim wrote in Village Voice:

In the Bedroom was the first film to premiere at the Sundance Film Festival to receive an Academy Award nomination for Best Picture. It also received nominations for Best Actor, Best Actress, Best Supporting Actress, and Best Adapted screenplay, more nominations than any film to premiere at Sundance until Precious in 2009.

Critical reception

Upon its release, the film received critical acclaim for its direction, script, and performances, notably Wilkinson and Spacek. On Rotten Tomatoes the film has a "certified fresh" approval rating of 93% based on 139 reviews, with an average score of 7.90/10. The site's consensus states "Expertly crafted and performed, In the Bedroom is a quietly wrenching portrayal of grief." On Metacritic the film has a score of 86 out of 100 based on reviews from 31 critics, indicating "universal acclaim".

David Edelstein of Slate Magazine in his review of the film wrote that "it is the best movie of the last several years" and described it "the most evocative, the most mysterious, the most inconsolably devastating" film. He further mentioned that the effect of the film "isn't over when you leave the theater" and that it's "always going to be there". He also called In the Bedroom a "masterpiece".

Neil Norman of The Evening Standard stated "It is apparent that Field has not only studied the masters of cinematic understatement, such as Ozu and Bergman, but that he fully understands their processes... Field's achievement is such a perfectly consummated marriage of intent and execution that he need never make another movie. I would not be alone, I think, in hoping he will make many more."

William Arnold of the Seattle Post-Intelligencer compared Field's direction to Kubrick's, saying that it "manages to feel both highly controlled and effortlessly spontaneous at the same time; and his lifting of the facade of this picturesque, Norman Rockwell setting is carried out with surgical precision". He further mentioned that "like Kubrick, Field doesn't make any moral judgments about his characters, and his film remains stubbornly enigmatic. It can be read as a high-class revenge thriller, an ode to the futility of vengeance or almost anything in between."

Stanley Kauffmann of The New Republic wrote, "In the Bedroom leaves us with the happy knowledge that with Field the American film scene, continually deplored as scraggly, can boast another admirable directing talent. Roger Ebert of the Chicago Sun-Times stated in his review that it is "one of the best-directed films of the year" and that "every performance has a perfect tone".  He listed In the Bedroom as his third best film of the year 2001. Rolling Stone's Peter Travers called the film "an uncommonly good movie" that "will hit you hard." He also mentioned that "Oscar would be a fool" if it ignores Sissy Spacek and Tom Wilkinson's "career-crowning performances". A. O. Scott included the film in his New York Times essay "The most important films of the past decade — and why they mattered."

In the Bedroom was also chosen by the New York Times Film Critics for their "Best 1,000 Films of All Time" list.

The February 2020 issue of New York Magazine lists In the Bedroom alongside Citizen Kane, Sunset Boulevard, Dr, Strangelove, Butch Cassidy and the Sundance Kid, The Conversation, Nashville, Taxi Driver, The Elephant Man, Pulp Fiction, There Will Be Blood, and Roma as "The Best Movies That Lost Best Picture at the Oscars".Among the negative reviews of the film include Paul Tatara of the CNN mentioning that the film "flounders" despite the good performances. Stephen Hunter of The Washington Post said "it opens brilliantly" but goes on to "self-negating absurdity."

Box officeIn the Bedroom was the second highest-grossing film that premiered at the Sundance Film Festival from 2000 to 2009, after Napoleon Dynamite. The film grossed a worldwide total of $44.8 million. It went on to become, at the time, the highest-grossing non-IMAX film in history never to reach the top 10 in a given week, and also one of the most successful films in history, with an expense-to-profit ratio of 1:25.

Home media
The film was released on DVD in a bare-bones edition containing no extras or director's commentary. In 2002 when Field was asked by the New York Times why this was the case he said "Once a film is made available to the public, the right of interpretation belongs to the viewer. Unless it's something historical -- like Citizen Kane or Raging Bull -- it seems really silly to have that kind of thing."

Popular culture

During season four (episode eight "Mergers and Acquisitions") of The Sopranos, Tony shows Carmela the new media center he has installed in the pool house, and she replies that she will pick up In the Bedroom'' for them to watch.

Accolades

Film archives
A 35mm safety print is housed in the permanent collection of the UCLA Film & Television Archive.

References

External links
 
 
 
 
 

2001 films
2001 crime drama films
American crime drama films
Films directed by Todd Field
Films based on short fiction
Films featuring a Best Drama Actress Golden Globe-winning performance
Films set in Maine
Films shot in Maine
American independent films
Films scored by Thomas Newman
American films about revenge
Films about grieving
2001 directorial debut films
2001 independent films
Films about domestic violence
Films about families
2000s English-language films
2000s American films